Xyridacma ustaria is a moth of the  family Geometridae. It was first described by Francis Walker in 1863 from specimens obtained in Auckland. It is endemic to New Zealand. X. ustaria has been found on Codfish Island in May with larvae recorded on Pittosporum tenuifolium. It has also been found at Paroa in February as well as in Canterbury.

References

Oenochrominae
Moths of New Zealand
Moths described in 1863
Endemic fauna of New Zealand
Taxa named by Francis Walker (entomologist)
Endemic moths of New Zealand